is a Japanese tennis player.

Watanuki has a career high ATP singles ranking of 477 achieved on 29 September 2014. He also has a career high ATP doubles ranking of 520 achieved on 12 June 2017.

Watanuki made his Grand Slam main draw debut at the 2017 Wimbledon Championships in the mixed doubles draw partnering Makoto Ninomiya, reaching the second round before losing to Ivan Dodig and Sania Mirza.

Watanuki has two brothers, Keisuke and Yosuke who are both also professional tennis players.

External links

1990 births
Living people
Japanese male tennis players
Sportspeople from Saitama (city)
21st-century Japanese people